"Arms Around the World" is a song by English singer Louise, released on 22 September 1997 as the lead single from her second studio album, Woman in Me (1997). It appeared on several music charts, peaking at number four on the UK Singles Chart in September 1997. As reported by the Official Charts Company in January 2020, "Arms Around the World" has sold 159,000 copies in the UK. The video was directed by Toby Tremlett.

Critical reception
Jon O'Brien from AllMusic viewed "Arms Around the World" as a Janet Jackson-inspired track, adding that it sounds like her 1995 song "Runaway". British magazine Music Week rated it three out of five, writing further that "Louise attempts to do a Kylie with a more complex and mature sound, but her efforts are let down by an unsubstantial song lacking any real sparkle." Gerald Martinez from New Sunday Times described the song as "anthemic".

Track listings
 UK CD1
 "Arms Around the World" (radio mix)
 "Arms Around the World" (Rated PG club mix)
 "Arms Around the World" (T-Empo club mix)
 "Arms Around the World" (Farley & Heller Fire Island vocal mix)

 UK CD2
 "Arms Around the World" (radio mix)
 "Don't Be Shy"
 "Intimate"

 UK cassette single
 "Arms Around the World" (radio mix)
 "Don't Be Shy"
 "Arms Around the World" (T-Empo club mix)

Charts

Weekly charts

Year-end charts

Sales

|}

References

1997 songs
1997 singles
Louise Redknapp songs
EMI Records singles
First Avenue Records singles
Songs written by Denis Ingoldsby
Songs written by Louise Redknapp
Songs written by Oliver Smallman
Songs written by Trevor Steel